Argentocoxos was a Caledonian chief in the early 3rd century.  He is known from the Historia Romana of Cassius Dio, who gives an account of the campaigns of Septimius Severus in that region.  His name means "silver leg" and shows that the Picts were Celts.

After treaty negotiations in the year 210, his wife spoke with the Empress, Julia Augusta, about Caledonian and Roman society.  Dio presents the account with a traditional topos, contrasting the vigorous virtue of barbarian life with Roman decadence

References

3rd-century monarchs in Europe
Celtic rulers
Celtic warriors
Pictish people
Place of birth unknown
Scotland in the Roman era
Year of birth unknown
Year of death unknown